Roger Charles Osborne (born 9 March 1950) is a former professional footballer who is best known for scoring the winning goal in the 1978 FA Cup Final.

Biography
Born in Otley, East Suffolk in 1950, Osborne was signed by Ipswich Town from Suffolk & Ipswich League club Westerfield United in October 1970.  He made his league debut on 27 October 1973 against Wolverhampton Wanderers at Portman Road, Ipswich Town winning 2–0.

In 1978, he was part of the Ipswich team that won the FA Cup against Arsenal, scoring the winning goal in the 77th minute, in a 1–0 victory. His celebration upon scoring the winning goal caused him to faint and be substituted with only ten minutes of the match remaining. In 1979, he was loaned to NASL side Detroit Express, for whom he played 22 matches. Osborne played his final game for Ipswich on 15 November 1980 in a league match against Leicester City.

In 1981, he moved to Colchester United where he played out until 1986, making over 200 appearances. After retiring from professional football, he worked as a lorry driver and at the Willis Faber Sports Centre in Rushmere St Andrew, which was run by former Colchester manager Dick Graham. He also played for non-League clubs Sudbury Town, Braintree Town, Felixstowe Port & Town and SIL club Westerfield, whom he also managed.

Osborne became the manager of the sports centre, now known as the Ipswich School Sports Centre (ISSC) Sports Centre but is now retired.

Honours
Ipswich Town
FA Cup: 1977–78

Individual
PFA Team of the Year: 1981–82 Fourth Division
Colchester United Player of the Year: 1985–86
Ipswich Town Hall of Fame: Inducted 2010

References

External links
Ipswich Town F.C. review of '77-'78 season
Detroit Express stats

1950 births
People from Suffolk Coastal (district)
Living people
Ipswich Town F.C. players
Detroit Express players
Colchester United F.C. players
Sudbury Town F.C. players
Braintree Town F.C. players
Felixstowe & Walton United F.C. players
North American Soccer League (1968–1984) players
Association football midfielders
English footballers
English expatriate sportspeople in the United States
Expatriate soccer players in the United States
English expatriate footballers
FA Cup Final players